Hans Heinrich Lammers (27 May 1879 – 4 January 1962) was a German jurist and prominent Nazi politician. From 1933 until 1945 he served as Chief of the Reich Chancellery under Adolf Hitler. During the 1948–1949 Ministries Trial, Lammers was found guilty of war crimes and crimes against humanity and sentenced to 20 years' imprisonment.

Early life 
Born in Lublinitz (now Lubliniec, Poland) in Upper Silesia, the son of a veterinarian, Lammers completed law school at the universities of Breslau (Wrocław) and Heidelberg, obtained his doctorate in 1904, and was appointed judge at the Amtsgericht (district court) of Beuthen (Bytom) in 1912. During World War I, as a volunteer and officer of the German Army, he received the Iron Cross, First and Second Class. After World War I he joined the national conservative German National People's Party (DNVP) and resumed his career as a lawyer reaching by 1922 the position of undersecretary at the Reich Ministry of the Interior.

Nazi career 
In 1932, Lammers joined the Nazi Party and achieved rapid promotions: he was appointed head of the police department, and, after the Nazi seizure of power in 1933 State Secretary and Chief of the Reich Chancellery. At the recommendation of Interior Reichsminister Wilhelm Frick, he became the centre of communications and chief legal adviser for all government departments. In October 1933, he was made a member of Hans Frank's Academy for German Law. From 1 December 1937, he was a member of Hitler's cabinet as a Reichsminister without Portfolio. On 30 August 1939, immediately prior to the outbreak of the Second World War, Lammers was appointed by Hitler to the six-person Council of Ministers for Defense of the Reich, which was set up to operate as a "war cabinet". In that position, he was able to review all pertinent documents regarding national security and domestic policy even before they were forwarded to Hitler in person. The historian Martin Kitchen explains that the centralization of power accorded to the Reich Chancellery and therefore to its head made Lammers become "one of the most important men in Nazi Germany". From the vantage point of most government officers, Lammers seemed to speak on behalf of Hitler, the ultimate authority within the Reich. Lammers was also one of the first officials to sign government correspondence with "Heil Hitler", which became a requisite greeting for civil servants and eventually so ubiquitous that failure to use it was considered an "overt sign of dissidence", which could trigger attention from the Gestapo. In 1940, Lammers was also promoted to honorary SS-Obergruppenführer.

From January 1943, Lammers served as president of the cabinet when Hitler was absent from their meetings. Along with Martin Bormann, he increasingly controlled access to Hitler. By early 1943, the war produced a labour crisis for the regime. Hitler agreed to the creation of a three-man committee with representatives of the state, the army and the party in an attempt to centralise control of the war economy and over the home front. The committee members were Lammers (Chief of the Reich Chancellery), Field Marshal Wilhelm Keitel, chief of the Oberkommando der Wehrmacht (Armed Forces High Command; OKW), and Bormann, who controlled the Party. Hitler seemed to be in agreement with that proposal since none of them posed a threat to his leadership or would disagree with him. The committee was intended to independently propose measures regardless of the wishes of various ministries, with Hitler reserving most final decisions to himself. The committee, soon known as the Dreierausschuß (Committee of Three), met eleven times between January and August 1943. However, it ran up against resistance from Hitler's cabinet ministers, who headed deeply-entrenched spheres of influence and were excluded from the committee. Seeing it as a threat to their power, Joseph Goebbels, Albert Speer, Hermann Göring and Heinrich Himmler worked together to bring it down. The result was that nothing changed, and the Committee of Three declined into irrelevance.

Over time, Lammers lost power and influence because of the increasing irrelevancy of his position due to the war and as a consequence of Martin Bormann's growing influence with Hitler.

1945
In April 1945, Lammers was arrested by SS troops during the final days of the Nazi regime, in connection with the upheaval surrounding Hermann Göring. On 23 April, as the Soviets tightened the encirclement of Berlin, Göring consulted Luftwaffe General Karl Koller and Lammers. All agreed that Göring was Hitler's designated successor and was to act as his deputy if Hitler ever became incapacitated. Göring concluded that by remaining in Berlin to face certain death, Hitler had incapacitated himself from governing. Acting on the matter, Göring sent a telegram from Berchtesgaden, Bavaria, arguing that since Hitler was cut off in Berlin, Göring should assume leadership of Germany. Göring set a time limit of 22:00 that night (23 April), when he would consider Hitler incapacitated. The telegram was intercepted by Bormann, who convinced Hitler that Göring was a traitor and that the telegram was a demand to resign or be overthrown. Hitler responded angrily and ordered SS troops to arrest Göring. Soon afterward, Hitler removed Göring from all of his offices and ordered Göring, his staff and Lammers to be placed under house arrest at Obersalzberg. Lammers was taken prisoner by American forces, but in the meantime, his wife, Elfriede (née Tepel), committed suicide near Obersalzberg (the site of Hitler's mountain retreat) in early May 1945, as did his daughter, Ilse, two days later.

Postwar insights

After the war's conclusion, Lammers provided Allied interrogators with some insights into the nature of the Third Reich's hierarchy. Postwar mythology was such that many were convinced Hitler had completely ostracised the aristocratic officers under his command, but the truth was somewhat different. Lammers reported to the Allies that Nazi kingpins and high-ranking Wehrmacht officers received lavish gifts, severance packages, expropriated estates and huge cash awards. Recipients of such benefits included Generals Heinz Guderian, Paul Ludwig Ewald von Kleist, Wilhelm Ritter von Leeb, Gerd von Rundstedt, and one of the Holocaust's chief architects, Reinhard Heydrich.

Trial, conviction and death 
In April 1946, Lammers was a defense witness at the Nuremberg trials. Starting in April 1949, he was tried in the Ministries Trial, one of the subsequent Nuremberg trials, and was sentenced to 20 years in prison. The sentence was later commuted to 10 years by US High Commissioner John J. McCloy, and he was released from Landsberg Prison in January 1951. Lammers died on 4 January 1962 in Düsseldorf and was buried in Berchtesgaden in the same plot as were his wife and daughter.

References
Informational notes

Citations

Bibliography

External links
 
 from The Simon Wiesenthal Center 
 

1879 births
1962 deaths
German jurists
German people convicted of crimes against humanity
German people convicted of war crimes
Heidelberg University alumni
Members of the Academy for German Law
Nazi Germany ministers
Nazi Party officials
Nazi Party politicians
People convicted by the United States Nuremberg Military Tribunals
People from Lubliniec
People from the Province of Silesia
Prussian Army personnel
Recipients of the Iron Cross (1914), 1st class
SS-Obergruppenführer
University of Breslau alumni